In number theory, Meyer's theorem on quadratic forms states that an indefinite quadratic form Q in five or more variables over the field of rational numbers nontrivially represents zero. In other words, if the equation

Q(x) = 0

has a non-zero real solution, then it has a non-zero rational solution (the converse is obvious). By clearing the denominators, an integral solution x may also be found.

Meyer's theorem is usually deduced from the Hasse–Minkowski theorem (which was proved later) and the following statement: 

 A rational quadratic form in five or more variables represents zero over the field Qp of the p-adic numbers  for all p.

Meyer's theorem is best possible with respect to the number of variables: there are indefinite rational quadratic forms Q in four variables which do not represent zero. One family of examples is given by 

Q(x1,x2,x3,x4) = x12 + x22 − p(x32 + x42),

where p is a prime number that is congruent to 3 modulo 4. This can be proved by the method of infinite descent using the fact that if the sum of two perfect squares is divisible by such a p then each summand is divisible by p.

See also 

 Lattice (group)
 Oppenheim conjecture

References
 
 
 
 

Quadratic forms
Theorems in number theory